Separate Ways may refer to:

Separate Ways (Elvis Presley album), 1973 compilation by Elvis Presley
"Separate Ways" (Elvis Presley song), title track of the above album
Separate Ways, a 1981 film starring Karen Black
"Separate Ways (Worlds Apart)", 1983 single by Journey
"Separate Ways", 1992 single of the After Hours album by Gary Moore
"Separate Ways" (Faye Wong song), title track of 2001 EP by Faye Wong
"Separate Ways (Worlds Apart)", 2002 episode of Dawson's Creek
Separate Ways (Teddy Thompson album), 2005 album by Teddy Thompson, or its title track 
Separate Ways (novel), novel by Ichiyō Higuchi